The 1995 North Atlantic Conference men's basketball tournament was hosted by the higher seeds in head-to-head matchups. The final was held at Daskalakis Athletic Center on the campus of Drexel University. Drexel gained its second consecutive America East Conference Championship and an automatic berth to the NCAA tournament with its win over Boston University. Drexel was given the 13th seed in the East Regional of the NCAA Tournament and lost in the first round to Oklahoma State 73–49.

Bracket and results

* Game ended in overtime

See also
America East Conference

References

America East Conference men's basketball tournament
1994–95 North Atlantic Conference men's basketball season